The 2015 Copa Sudamericana final stages were played from September 22 to December 9, 2015. A total of 16 teams competed in the final stages to decide the champions of the 2015 Copa Sudamericana.

Qualified teams
The 15 winners of the second stage (eight from winners of the first stage, four from Brazil, three from Argentina) and the defending champions qualified for the final stages.

Seeding
The qualified teams were seeded in the final stages according to the draw of the tournament, which was held on July 16, 2015, 20:00 UTC−4, at the Salón Joao Havelange of the CONMEBOL Convention Centre in Luque, Paraguay, with each team assigned a "seed" 1–16 by draw.

Format
In the final stages, the 16 teams played a single-elimination tournament, with the following rules:
Each tie was played on a home-and-away two-legged basis, with the higher-seeded team hosting the second leg.
In the round of 16, quarterfinals, and semifinals, if tied on aggregate, the away goals rule would be used. If still tied, the penalty shoot-out would be used to determine the winner (no extra time would be played).
In the finals, if tied on aggregate, the away goals rule would not be used, and 30 minutes of extra time would be played. If still tied after extra time, the penalty shoot-out would be used to determine the winner.
If there were two semifinalists from the same association, they would have to play each other.

Bracket
The bracket of the knockout stages was determined by the seeding as follows:
Round of 16:
Match A: Seed 1 vs. Seed 16
Match B: Seed 2 vs. Seed 15
Match C: Seed 3 vs. Seed 14
Match D: Seed 4 vs. Seed 13
Match E: Seed 5 vs. Seed 12
Match F: Seed 6 vs. Seed 11
Match G: Seed 7 vs. Seed 10
Match H: Seed 8 vs. Seed 9
Quarterfinals:
Match S1: Winner A vs. Winner H
Match S2: Winner B vs. Winner G
Match S3: Winner C vs. Winner F
Match S4: Winner D vs. Winner E
Semifinals: (if there were two semifinalists from the same association, they would have to play each other)
Match F1: Winner S1 vs. Winner S4
Match F2: Winner S2 vs. Winner S3
Finals: Winner F1 vs. Winner F2

Round of 16
The first legs were played on September 22–24, and the second legs were played on September 29–30 and October 1, 2015.

|}

Match A

River Plate won 2–1 on aggregate and advanced to the quarterfinals (Match S1).

Match B

Tied 0–0 on aggregate, Defensor Sporting won on penalties and advanced to the quarterfinals (Match S2).

Match C

Tied 2–2 on aggregate, Santa Fe won on away goals and advanced to the quarterfinals (Match S3).

Match D

Sportivo Luqueño won 2–1 on aggregate and advanced to the quarterfinals (Match S4).

Match E

Atlético Paranaense won 1–0 on aggregate and advanced to the quarterfinals (Match S4).

Match F

Independiente won 1–0 on aggregate and advanced to the quarterfinals (Match S3).

Match G

Huracán won 4–1 on aggregate and advanced to the quarterfinals (Match S2).

Match H

Tied 2–2 on aggregate, Chapecoense won on penalties and advanced to the quarterfinals (Match S1).

Quarterfinals
The first legs were played on October 20–22, and the second legs were played on October 27–29, 2015.

|}

Match S1

River Plate won 4–3 on aggregate and advanced to the semifinals (Match F2).

Match S2

Huracán won 1–0 on aggregate and advanced to the semifinals (Match F2).

Match S3

Santa Fe won 2–1 on aggregate and advanced to the semifinals (Match F1).

Match S4

Sportivo Luqueño won 2–1 on aggregate and advanced to the semifinals (Match F1).

Semifinals
Since there were two semifinalists from Argentina, they had to play each other instead of their original opponents as determined by the seeding.

The first legs were played on November 4–5, and the second legs were played on November 25–26, 2015.

|}

Match F1

Tied 1–1 on aggregate, Santa Fe won on away goals and advanced to the finals.

Match F2

Huracán won 3–2 on aggregate and advanced to the finals.

Finals

The finals were played on a home-and-away two-legged basis, with the higher-seeded team hosting the second leg. If tied on aggregate, the away goals rule would not be used, and 30 minutes of extra time would be played. If still tied after extra time, the penalty shoot-out would be used to determine the winner.

The first leg was played on December 2, and the second leg was played on December 9, 2015.

Tied 0–0 on aggregate, Santa Fe won on penalties.

References

External links
Copa Sudamericana 2015, CONMEBOL.com 

2